U.S. Route 70 (US 70) is a part of the United States Numbered Highway System that runs from Globe, Arizona, to the Crystal Coast of the US state of North Carolina. From the Tennessee state line near Paint Rock to Asheville it follows the historic Dixie Highway, running concurrently with US 25. The highway connects several major cities including Asheville, High Point, Greensboro, Durham, Raleigh, Goldsboro, and New Bern. From Beaufort on east, US 70 shares part of the Outer Banks Scenic Byway, a National Scenic Byway, before ending in the community of Atlantic, located along Core Sound.

US 70 is an original US Highway, signed on November 11, 1926, when the US Highway System was approved. Since then, the highway has been realigned in places. One of the larger extensions of US 70 came in 1931 when the highway was extended concurrently along North Carolina Highway 101 (NC 101) from Beaufort to Atlantic. While sections of US 70 have been converted to freeway standards, along most of the routing it is a four-lane highway. Several new projects beginning in the 2000s have placed US 70 on interstate grade freeways, such as the Clayton and Goldsboro bypasses. On May 24, 2016, AASHTO assigned the Future I-42 designation to the majority of US 70's routing east of Garner. Additionally, a short freeway segment in east Durham was officially designated as I-885 on June 30, 2022, a route that connects I-40 to I-85 through the Research Triangle Park and east Durham.

Route description 
US 70 travels through several diverse regions in North Carolina, including the Bald and Black Mountains of Western North Carolina, the rural Foothills, the urban Piedmont, the farmlands of the Inner Banks, and the coastal communities of the Crystal Coast. All of US 70 east of Durham, and smaller segments including Statesville to Salisbury and Lexington to Greensboro, are listed in the National Highway System, a network of roads important to the country's economy, defense, and mobility. US 70 also overlaps two state scenic byways: the Appalachian Medley, from Hot Springs to Walnut, and the Clayton Bypass Scenic Byway, from I-40 to US 70 Bus.

Western Mountains and Foothills 
US 70, in concurrency with US 25, enters from Tennessee as a two-lane mountain highway meandering through the Bald Mountains. In Hot Springs it crosses the French Broad River and the Appalachian Trail, then goes northeasterly through Tanyard Gap to Hurricane. Proceeding south, it goes through the Walnut Mountains and then joins NC 213 near Walnut. Continuing on a more southeasterly routing, it becomes the US 25 Bus./US 70 Bus. split-off towards downtown Marshall at Mashburn Gap. At the Hayes Run Road interchange, NC 213 splits and continues towards Mars Hill. Before US 25 Bus./US 70 Bus. rejoins at Ivy River Road, the highway widens to four lanes; afterwards, it follows along Ivy Creek before crossing the Madison/Buncombe county line.

In Weaverville, US 25/US 70 joins Future I-26/US 19/US 23 (exit 19), then continues south on the Morris L. McGough Freeway to Asheville. US 25 separates at Merrimon Avenue (exit 23), continuing solo into downtown Asheville. At the Patton Avenue interchange, US 70 switches to an I-240/US 74A concurrency as it goes east along the Billy Graham Freeway.  At Charlotte Avenue (exit 5B), US 70/US 74A splits from I-240 before it goes through the Beaucatcher Cut. At College Street, which changes into Tunnel Road, US 70/US 74A passes through Beaucatcher Tunnel (built in 1927). On the eastern side of Beaucatcher Mountain, US 70/US ;74A goes through a commercial corridor that leads to Asheville Mall, where US 74A splits and continues along South Tunnel Road and connects with I-240 at a unique three-level diamond interchange. In the East Asheville area is the historic Oteen Veterans Administration Hospital Historic District as well as the Blue Ridge Parkway. At Jones Mountain, US 70 leaves the Asheville city limits and begins its parallel north of I-40, as it goes through Swannanoa and Black Mountain. At Ridgecrest, US 70 merges with I-40 (exit 65). At Swannanoa Gap it crosses the Eastern Continental Divide (elevation ) and enters McDowell County.

At the top of the gap, in addition to a reduced speed limit there is a truck information station that requires all trucks to go through before continuing. The following  descent is a 6% grade along Youngs Ridge to Old Fort, along which are several reduce-speed warning lights and three runaway truck ramps. It is likely that, on both on the ascent and the descent, most trucks and some cars will be going slower than posted speed limits, and that, despite the fact that this section is six lanes wide, slower vehicles may be traveling in the passing lanes. At Old Fort, US 70 splits from I-40 (at exit 72) and travels through the downtown area and by the Mountain Gateway Museum and Heritage Center. East of Old Fort, US 70 travels northeasterly towards Marion and forms the southern boundary of the Pisgah National Forest. At Pleasant Gardens, it connects with NC 80, which travelers can follow towards Mount Mitchell, the highest peak east of the Mississippi River. Crossing the Catawba River and entering Marion, US 70 connects with US 221/NC 226 and then forms a short concurrency with US 221 Bus. along Main Street. East of Marion, US 70 connects with NC 126 in Nebo, where travelers can visit Lake James State Park.

Entering Burke County near Bridgewater, US 70 passes through Glen Alpine and then enters Morganton, where it forms a brief concurrency with US 64 as it proceeds along Fleming Drive, while US 70 Bus. passes through the downtown area. Continuing east, it goes through the towns of Drexel, Valdese, Rutherford College, Connelly Springs and Hildebran before crossing into Catawba County at Long View. In Hickory, US 70 serves as the town's commercial corridor as US 321 Bus. begins its concurrency at the US 321 interchange. In Conover, US 321 Bus. turns at Northwest Boulevard towards Newton and then crosses NC 16. Continuing east through Claremont and Catawba, US 70 crosses the Catawba River for the second time and enters Iredell County.

Piedmont Triad and the Triangle 
After passing through Celeste Hinkle and by the Statesville Regional Airport, US 70 enters the city limits of Statesville and connects with US 64/NC 90 at the intersection of Newton Drive and Garner Bagnal Boulevard. Passing south of the downtown area, it begins to parallel the Norfolk Southern Railway south to Salisbury. Crossing US 21 at Shelton Avenue and I-77 (exit 49A), it leaves Statesville and proceeds southeasterly along Statesville Boulevard, also known as the Jim Graham Highway, through an area of farmland and factories that are wedged between the four-lane highway and the railway. After crossing into Rowan County, US 70 goes through Cleveland and shares a short concurrency with NC 801 near Barber before entering Salisbury. On Jake Alexander Boulevard, US 70 shares a concurrency with US 601 until the Rowan Mills area, where it switches onto Main Street with US 29 and later NC 150. Traveling northeasterly through downtown Salisbury, it then goes by the North Carolina Transportation Museum before passing through Spencer. At the Yadkin River, the four-lane highway reduces to two-lanes as it crosses over into Davidson County. Adjacent to the bridge over which US 29/US 70/NC 150 travels are the Wil-Cox Bridge, a concrete arch pedestrian bridge, and two North Carolina Railroad (NCRR) Warren truss bridges.

At  from the Yadkin River, NC 150 splits towards Churchland while US 29/US 70 merges with I-85/US 52 (at exit 84). After a  concurrency, I-85 splits off and continues towards Greensboro, and I-285 begins (at exit 87). Entering the Lexington city limits, additional route changes occur; I-285/US 52 departs (at exit 87) towards Winston-Salem, and US 64 merges from Mocksville. After skirting north of downtown Lexington, US 64 departs again towards Asheboro, and the highway continues northeasterly as a four-lane expressway. After passing through Thomasville, it then proceeds briefly through Randolph County and then into High Point and Guilford County. Staying south of the downtown area, it connects with I-74 with its second three-level diamond interchange. Near Groometown, the highway merges with I-85 for a brief  concurrency (between exits 118 and 120A). To connect with I-73/US 421 (Greensboro Urban Loop), travelers must continue on I-85 or stay in the left travel lanes; this stretch of freeway features numerous sign gantries and surface markings to guide travelers. Continuing northeasterly along Preddy Boulevard into Greensboro, it connects with South US 220 (at exit 35), where travelers can connect to Interstate 85, or go northbound to reach I-40 west or the Greensboro Coliseum. Merging onto I-40/US 220/US 29 (at exit 219), the following  stretch of freeway is known locally as "Death Valley", a nickname given because of the high number of deaths due to car crashes in this area, owed to having five routes attached to it. Separating from I-40/I-85 Bus. at the O'Henry Boulevard interchange (at exit 223), US 29/US 70/US 220 continue north, passing by the North Carolina A&T campus to the Wendover Avenue interchange, where the 3 routes break up. With US 29 continuing north along the expressway towards Reidsville and Danville, Virginia, and US 220 North going west on Wendover Avenue to follow Battleground Road to Summerfield, US 70 again proceeds solo, east on Wendover Ave towards Burlington. At the eastern edge of Greensboro's city limit, US 70 connects with I-785/I-840 (Greensboro Urban Loop). Leaving Greensboro and entering McLeansville, US 70 takes on the name "Burlington Road" as well as the Charlotte Hawkins Brown Memorial Highway. Here it is a two lane road, and is also an important route that connects McLeansville with other small towns such as Sedalia and Gibsonville, as well as the Rock Creek and Stoney Creek centers in Whitsett; east of Whitsett, it enters Alamance County.

Passing south of Elon, US 70 runs on Church St, a four lane retail corridor, as it enters Burlington's city limits. It connects with NC 87 and NC 100 as well as NC 62 as it enters downtown Burlington. Sharing a brief concurrency with NC 62 through the downtown area, it then proceeds southeasterly to Haw River. As it nears the town of Haw River, it then goes northeasterly again to bypass the town and crosses over the Haw River via Three Governors Bridge; heading easterly again, the highway drops back to two lanes after connecting with NC 49. At Mebane, US 70 crosses into Orange County. Passing through the communities of Miles and Efland, and parallels the NCRR railroad just to the north, US 70 makes a unique median divide in Duke Forest to merge with the I-85 Connector (SR 1239); constructed in the mid-1950s when US 70 was rerouted here onto what is now I-40/I-85. Crossing the Eno River, US 70 passes along the northern edge of Hillsborough, while US 70 Bus. goes through its downtown area. Crossing the Eno River again, it borders along the Eno River State Park, while traveling through another area of the Duke Forest. At Eno, US 70 merges onto I-85 (exit 170), while US 70 Bus. continues along its former alignment to Bennett Place.

Entering both Durham and Durham County, I-85/US 70 maintains an east–west routing north of the downtown area, along a stretch of highway dedicated to Dr. John H. Franklin. At exit 174A US 15/US 501 join the freeway; at exit 176B US 501 departs and continues north along Duke Street. US 70 leaves I-85/US 15 at exit 178, and forms a concurrency with I-885, which begins at the interchange. I-85 and US 15 continue north toward Oxford and Petersburg. Traveling on a southeasterly direction along four-lane freeway in East Durham, it has interchanges with US 70 Bus./ NC 98 and Carr Drive. Soon after I-885 departs from the route to head toward I-40, US 70 downgrades to an expressway. At Bethesda, Miami Boulevard (SR 1959) continues south into the Research Triangle Park, while US 70 enters Wake County along New Raleigh Highway.

After crossing Raleigh city limits, US 70, here called Glenwood Avenue, makes a connection with I-540 (exit 292), which goes to the front entrance of RDU Airport; the following Lumley Road/Westgate Road interchange (at exit 293) goes to the North Cargo and General Aviation area of RDU Airport. Adjacent to the airport is William B. Umstead State Park. With NC 50 joining US 70 at Creedmoor Road, US 70 crosses under I-440/US 1 after passing by Crabtree Valley Mall. Inside the Raleigh Beltline, US 70/NC 50 travel through a residential area until Wade Avenue, where they join US 401 along Capital Boulevard. In the downtown area, Capital Boulevard splits into Dawson and McDowell Streets; various sites are adjacent or nearby, including the North Carolina Museum of Natural Sciences and North Carolina Museum of History (via Jones Street), the North Carolina State Capitol (via Morgan Street), the Raleigh Convention Center, the Red Hat Amphitheater, and the Duke Energy Center for the Performing Arts (via South Street). Leaving the downtown area after the Martin Luther King Jr. Boulevard/Western Boulevard interchange, Dawson–McDowell Streets merge and become Saunders Street, which promptly exits the Raleigh Beltline crossing under I-40/US 64. In Garner, US 401 departs along Fayetteville Street towards Fuquay-Varina, followed by NC 50 along Benson Road towards Benson. East of Garner, US 70 merges with I-40 (exit 306A), while US 70 Bus. head towards Clayton. At the Wake/Johnston county line, US 70 splits from I-40 for the last time (at exit 309) and onto the Clayton Bypass.

Coastal Plain and Down East 

After  along the Clayton Bypass, US 70 crosses US 70 Bus., from Clayton to Smithfiled, and changes from freeway to expressway. Continuing through Wilson's Mills and crossing the Neuse River, it enters Selma, where travelers have the choice to stay on mainline US 70, connecting with US 301/NC 39/NC 96, I-95, and US 70A, or take US 70 Bypass to avoid all that. Southeast of Selma, US 70 Bus. rejoins from Smithfield and near Princeton, US 70A rejoins from Pine Level. East of Princeton, it enters Wayne County. Northwest of Goldsboro, the US 70 Bypass spurs northeast towards I-795, while US 70 goes into Goldsboro. In Goldsboro, it also connects with I-795 and then joins a concurrency with US 13/US 117, passing north of the downtown area while US 70 Bus. goes through it via Grantham Street. After , US 117 separates and continues north; at Berkeley Boulevard, US 13 separates towards Snow Hill and also connects to Seymour Johnson Air Force Base. East of Goldsboro, US 70 Bus. reunites along Ash Street. Entering Lenoir County, near LaGrange, US 70 Bypass reconnects with US 70, where the highway continues east. US 70 connects with NC 148 at Falling Creek, which goes to the North Carolina Global TransPark. As it enters Kinston, it is joined by US 258, from Snow Hill, as they both bypass south of the downtown area, while US 70 Bus./US 258 Bus. go through the downtown area. Near Dupreeville, US 70 Bus./US 258 Bus. rejoin; they then separate, with US 258 continuing south to Richlands, while NC 58 shares a short concurrency before continuing towards Trenton.

Bypassing south of Dover, in Jones County, US 70 travels through the Great Dover Swamp, most of which has been drained and converted to farmland. After  it enters Craven County, south of Cove City. At Clarks Road (exit 409) is the Craven County Rest Area. At exit 410A US 17 joins in concurrency as the freeway enters New Bern. The freeway, designated the Richard Spaight Memorial Highway, passes southeast of the downtown area and enters James City after crossing the Trent River via the Freedom Memorial Bridges. Traveling southeast along the U.S. Marine Corp Highway, US 70 passes by the Coastal Carolina Regional Airport, and then enters the Croatan National Forest before reaching the Marine Corps Air Station Cherry Point, in Havelock. Going south, it crosses into Carteret County and then passes west of Newport as it leaves the Croatan National Forest and into Morehead City. After connecting with the eastern terminus of NC 24, which goes to Swansboro, US 70, along Arendell Street, is split in the middle by the NCRR railroad. Adjacent to the Carteret Community College is the Carteret County Visitor Center; the Atlantic Beach Bridge connects Morehead City with Bogue Banks, including Fort Macon State Park. Through the downtown area, it reaches the end of the peninsula and the Port of Morehead City. Crossing over the Newport River/Intracoastal Waterway, it travels along Radio Island and then crosses Beaufort Channel (Gallants Creek) via Grayden Paul Bridge into downtown Beaufort. Traveling along Cedar and Live Oak Streets, US 70 goes north out of Beaufort and then east, crossing over the North River and Ward Creek to Otway. Going southeast to Smyrna, it then turns northeasterly along the Core Sound. After crossing the Salter's Creek via Dan Taylor Memorial Bridge it connects with NC 12 continuing to Cedar Island and the Outer Banks.

History 
Established as an original U.S. Route (1926), US 70 was assigned along the Great Central Highway, in concurrency with NC 10, between Asheville and Beaufort; northwest of Asheville, US 70 shared concurrency with US 25/NC 20 (Dixie Highway) to the Tennessee state line. The original routing of US 70 connects the same cities as it does today through North Carolina, with interstate highways in parallel or in concurrency with it.

Early state routes 
In 1916 the North Carolina State Highway Commission prepared a map for the Five Year Federal Aid Program. The general present-day routing of US 70 was a mix of both improved and unimproved highways. When the highways were signed, the majority of US 70's routing ran along NC 10 which was built from the Georgia state line south of Murphy to Beaufort. However, the routing north and west of Asheville comprised parts of NC 20 and NC 29. US 70 was established as an original U.S. route in 1926.

Original routing 
US 70 was established as an original US highway running from US 66 near Holbrook, Arizona, to Beaufort, North Carolina. The highway entered the state at the Tennessee state line and followed along a topsoil road concurrently with NC 20. In Marshall, US 70 turned onto NC 20's former routing and followed it to the south. Upon reaching NC 29, US 70 turned to the south along the hard surface road and followed it to Asheville. North of Biltmore, US 70 turned left and followed along a hard surfaced road in concurrency with NC 10. Between Old Fort and Garden City the road switched to an oil-treated road and then briefly switched to a topsoil road between Garden City and Marion. As the road left Marion to the east, it again became a hard surface road. The highway continued east through Morganton and Hickory. In Conover, the highway turned due south until reaching Newton. In Newton, US 70/NC 10 turned to the left and followed a topsoil road to the southeast. The highway made several turns between the northeast and the southeast before reaching Statesville. The highway turned left in Statesville to follow along a hard-surfaced highway to Salisbury. Upon reaching Salisbury, US 70/NC 10 turned to the left and followed concurrently along US 170 to the northeast. In Greensboro, the route turned to the east through Burlington to Graham. The highway followed a brief concurrency with NC 62 between Graham and Mebane before again turning to the east. The route ran through Hillsborough and Durham before turning south through Brassfield and Nelson. In Cary, US 70/NC 10 met up with US 1/NC 50 and followed a brief concurrency between Cary and Raleigh. After passing through Raleigh, US 70 turned to the south to run through Garner before turning east to pass through Auburn and Clayton. Upon reaching Smithfield, the highway turned to the left and followed briefly along NC 22 to the northeast. Just before reaching Selma, US 70/NC 10 turned right to head to the southeast. The hard-surfaced highway passed through Goldsboro and La Grange before reaching Kinston. In Kinston, the highway turned to the northeast and ran briefly concurrent with NC 11 before running east toward Fort Barnwell. As the highway neared the Neuse River, it turned to the southeast to parallel the river to New Bern. Passing through New Bern, the highway continued to follow the Neuse until reaching Havelock where the river turns further to the east. Shortly after passing Havelock, the road turned toward the east. After intersecting NC 101 the road type changed to a topsoil road. The highway continued as a topsoil road until North Harlowe, where it became a graded road. Just before entering Beaufort the highway changed back to a hard surface road. US 70 and NC 10 both ended in Beaufort.

Early 20th century 
In 1928 US 70/NC 10 was swapped with route NC 101 towards Beaufort. Around 1929 US 70 was placed on its modern routing between Marion and Nebo; its former routing becoming part of NC 105. North of Newton, US 70 was given a new primary routing in concurrency with NC 110. In Raleigh, US 70 was placed on a new primary routing along Western Boulevard, then north along Boylan Avenue to South Street, then Fayetteville Street to Lenoir Street, and finally East Street; the old alignment along Hillsborough Road and by the state capital remained part of US 1/NC 50. In 1930 US 70/NC 10 was swapped with NC 100 between Gibsonville and Burlington. Also around that time US 70/NC 10 was rerouted in downtown Salisbury via Innis Street to Main Street, leaving behind Fulton and Liberty streets.

In 1931 US 70 was extended northeast from Beaufort to Atlantic, ending at Cedar Island Road (SR 1387). Around 1932 US 70 was rerouted in downtown Asheville from Biltmore Avenue onto Tunnel Road; the old alignment remained part of US 25. In 1934 both NC 10 and NC 20 were removed along US 70's route. By 1936, US 70 was placed on First Avenue through Hickory and was removed from Beaman Road near New Bern. In 1939 US 70 was removed from Hollins Road in Marshall.

Mid 20th century 
In 1941 US 70 was swapped with NC 55 from Kinston to west of New Bern.  Also around that same year, US 70 was given its modern routing between the Yadkin River and Lexington.  By 1944, US 70 was removed from Old Highway 70 Loop (SR 1620) near Icard; in Havelock, US 70 was removed from Church Road, Miller Boulevard and Roosevelt Boulevard to its modern alignment.  Around 1948, US 70 was swapped with US 70A in the Hickory–Conover area and with US 70A in Hillsborough. By 1949, US 70 was placed on its modern routing between Swannanoa and Black Mountain and between Lexington and Thomasville, swapped with US 70A in High Point, removed from Bennett Memorial Drive in Durham, and switched from Wilson Street to Kornegay Street in Dover.

In 1952 US 70 was placed on new bypasses in Lexington, Thomasville, and Durham; all former alignments became individual or extensions of existing US 70A. By 1953, US 70 was rerouted back onto Fulton Street and Liberty Street in Salisbury, US 70 was split on one-way streets in downtown Greensboro, and US 70 was rerouted onto Eden and Front Streets in New Bern. In 1954 US 70 was rerouted onto Woodfin Street in Asheville; placed on its modern alignment between Black Mountain and Old Fort, leaving behind Mill Creek Road (SR 1407)/Old US 70 (SR 1400), placed on one-way streets in downtown Raleigh, and rerouted on a more direct route between Smithfield and Princeton along existing secondary roads, leaving behind US 70A through Selma. Around 1956 US 70 was placed on new bypass south of Morganton. By 1957, US 70 was split on one-way streets in downtown Marion, replaced US 70A in Salisbury, leaving the downtown area, and placed on its modern alignment in western Rowan County. It was placed on its modern alignment from Thomasville to Greensboro, then continued east on freeway to Efland, its old alignment becoming US 70A; it was placed on new bypass east of Durham, its former alignment along Avondale Drive, Greer Street, and Miami Boulevard becoming parts of NC 55, NC 98, and US 70A respectively. It was placed on bypass north Goldsboro, leaving behind US 70A through the downtown area, and placed on bypass south of Kinston, also leaving behind US 70A through its downtown area. Around 1958 US 70 was removed from Ann Street to its current routing along Cedar Street in Beaufort. In 1960 US 25/US 70 was placed on new bypass north of Marshall, leaving behind US 25 Bus./US 70 Bus.

In 1961 US 70 was removed from Woodfin Street and onto the East–West Freeway in Asheville; in Salisbury, US 70 was rerouted following Innis Street south to I-85, then continued north in concurrency into Davidson County. In 1963 US 70 was rerouted back along its former alignment between Greensboro and Efland, replacing part of US 70A; the former freeway alignment remains part of I-85. Around 1964 US 70 was placed on new causeway over the Newport River/Intracoastal Waterway; bridges on the old alignment were removed, leaving Old Causeway Road (SR 1205) on Radio Island. Around 1965 US 70 was removed from I-85 in Rowan County, rerouted through downtown Salisbury on one-way streets, then north along Main Street in concurrency with US 29. In 1967 US 70 was rerouted onto O. Henry Boulevard to Wendover Avenue in Greensboro; its old alignment along Market Street was downgraded to secondary roads. In the same year, US 70 was adjusted at the Salisbury and Wilmington Street split. By 1968, US 70 was placed on a new bypass west of Newport, leaving behind Chatham Street (SR 1247). In 1969 US 70 was placed on a new bypass south of La Grange, leaving behind Washington Street (SR 1603). In 1970 US 70 eastbound was removed from Main Street and onto Logan Street in Marion. In the same year, US 70 was placed on a new bypass north of Princeton, leaving behind Dr. Donnie H. Jones Jr. Boulevard (SR 2556).

Late 20th century 
In 1972 US 19/US 23/US 70 was removed from Merrimon Avenue, between Asheville and Woodfin, and placed on a new freeway; US 25 remains along the old alignment. In Raleigh, US 70/NC 50 were removed from Glenwood Avenue and placed on the Raleigh Beltline to North Boulevard/Downtown Boulevard. In Atlantic, US 70 was truncated to its current eastern terminus at School Drive; the former alignment was abandoned, with a bridge removed from the Atlantic Harbor of Refuge Channel. From 1978 to 1979, in phases, US 70 was placed on a new bypass south of Dover and New Bern; the former alignment became Old US Highway 70 (SR 1005).

In 1981 US 70 was rerouted from Crosstown Expressway onto Charlotte, Poplar, and Pine Streets (the latter two removed for College Street) to Beaucatcher Tunnel; this replaced part of NC 694, while Crosstown Expressway was rerouted through Beaucatcher Cut. In Salisbury, US 70 was rerouted south along Jake Alexander Boulevard, in concurrency with US 601, to Main Street, where it joined US 29 through the city; the old alignment along Innes, Liberty, Fulton, and Lee Streets was downgraded to secondary roads. In Burlington, US 70/NC 62 was realigned along one-way streets along Church and Fisher Streets, eliminating the use of Davis and Hoke Streets. In 1982 US 25/US 70 was placed on a new alignment north of Marshall to Weaverville; the old alignment became an extension of existing business loops in Marshall and Weaverville, and some sections were downgraded to secondary roads around Woodfin. In the same year, upgrades between Black Mountain and Old Fort were completed, allowing the addition of I-40 alongside US 70. In 1987 US 25/US 70 was placed on a new bypass west of Walnut, leaving behind Walnut Drive (SR 1349). In 1989 US 70 was removed from downtown Raleigh and was completely rerouted onto the Raleigh Beltway going east, then south, continuing at I-40 southeasterly to exit 306; the former alignment through Raleigh and Garner became US 70 Bus., though unsigned inside the Raleigh Beltline. In 1990 US 70 was rerouted onto Industrial Boulevard and Monroe Street, from Newton Drive to east of I-77, in Statesville; the former alignment along Front Street and Salisbury Road was downgraded to secondary roads.

In 1991 one-way streets along Logan, New, and Garden Streets were discontinued and reallocated to the city of Marion to maintain; US 70 reverted to two-way traffic along Main and Court Streets. In the same year, US 70 was removed from the Raleigh Beltline and rerouted along Gleenwood Avenue, Wade Avenue, Capital Boulevard, Dawson–McDowell Streets, and Saunders Street. South of the Raleigh Beltline, it continued along Saunders, then Wilmington Street, and through Garner to I-40; the reroute in Wake County replaced all of US 70 Bus. In 1993 US 70 was rerouted onto a new bypass north of Haw River, leaving Main Street (SR 1801) and a short concurrency with NC 49. In Orange and Durham counties, US 70's concurrency with I-85 was extended  as part of a major reconfiguration of exits 172 and 173. The original configuration had Hillsborough Road weave in and out of I-85 between the two exits; the realignment of US 70 allowed NCDOT to remove the weave and re-purpose exit 172 as an interchange for NC 147 (completed in 2001). The former alignment became an extension of US 70 Bus., which for the remainder of the decade had a hidden concurrency with I-85/US 70, with the weave persisting during construction. In 1997 NCDOT established the oddity known as the four US 70s of Selma–Smithfield: US 70, US 70A, US 70 Bus. and US 70 Bypass. Before 1997, US 70 was routed through Smithfield while US 70A followed the pre-1954 route through Selma. The new configuration established US 70 following its former route east to Selma, with a short bypass route of I-95 (no interchange), then reconnecting to an existing section of US 70 east of I-95; US 70A was truncated near the I-95 interchange in Selma, while the former alignment through Smithfield became a business route.

21st century 
On June 9, 2008, the Clayton Bypass opened, redirecting US 70 onto I-40 between exits 306 to 309 and then on a new  four-lane freeway bypass south of Clayton. Planning for the bypass began in 1991, but construction did not start until 2005 because of several delays regarding the Dwarf wedgemussel, an endangered species, habitat in the area. Originally scheduled for completion in June 2009, a severe drought in 2007–2008 allowed construction to proceed more rapidly than anticipated. NCDOT was given the approval by AASHTO to officially designate US 70 along the bypass on May 6, 2008, with the former alignment becoming an extension of US 70 Bus. Compared to the former alignment through Clayton, the bypass is estimated to cut fifteen minutes of travel time for drivers traveling between Raleigh and eastern North Carolina. 

In 2010 US 70 was placed on Statesville Boulevard, a then new  four-lane expressway running east of Statesville towards Salisbury; the former alignment was downgraded to a secondary road.

In 2013 US 70 was placed on a new freeway, with an interchange with NC 148 at Falling Creek. Justification for the improvement was given as a need for better service to the Global TransPark; the old alignment was reduced from four to two lanes, becoming Sanderson Way (SR 2032).

In December 2011 the first section of the Goldsboro Bypass was opened from I-795 to Wayne Memorial Drive. The section was temporarily numbered as NC 44, while the western and eastern sections were under construction. The western section of the bypass from US 70 west of Goldsboro to I-795 opened on October 17, 2015. The final section from Wayne Memorial Drive to US 70 was completed in May 2016. The route is currently listed as US 70 Bypass., while the routes in the city are currently being signed as US 70 and US 70 Business.

In east Durham, the construction of the East End Connector linking NC 147 and US 70 began in February 2015 as part of the I-885 proposal. The project also altered the interchanges at Carr Road and NC 98 (Holloway Street), to a dumbbell and a diamond interchange, respectively. Once scheduled to be completed in January 2020, the East End Connector and related road improvement projects were eventually completed on June 30, 2022. I-885 was officially designated along the entire freeway portion of US 70, a route that continues past US 70 down toward I-40 through the Research Triangle Park.

Future

Greensboro / High Point 
Currently, the portion of US 70 going west of Greensboro runs concurrently with US 29 and US 220 (south), I-40 (west), and soon to be decommissioned I-85 Business (south), while the portion going east of Greensboro, remains on Wendover Avenue East leaving town towards Burlington. On, October 5, 2019, NCDOT submitted an application to AASHTO, and received approval, for the re-routing of US 70 in Greensboro, High Point, and a part of Thomasville. Under the state plan, it will continue west along Wendover Avenue through Greensboro to NC Highway 68 (Eastchester Drive) in High Point, and then onto NC 68, south-bound from High Point to the southern terminus of NC 68 in Thomasville. According to NCDOT, this will provide a more direct, continuous route through the cities of Greensboro and High Point, improve regional connectivity, and remove traffic from concurrent interstate routes (e.g. I-40's "Death Valley" interchange in Greensboro, and the I-85/US 29 interchange near Jamestown).

Raleigh to Morehead City 
A multi-county project, also known as the "US 70 Corridor" or "Super 70", is a collection of several projects along US 70 to improve passenger and freight movement eventually leading to the establishment of Interstate 42, which is the US Department of Transportation's High Priority Corridor #82.  The entire project has a budgeted cost (as of late 2018) of about $1.3 billion, and about 29 miles still without a budget. Some projects like the Clayton and Goldsboro bypasses are completed, while others have yet to be scheduled. The project involves the counties of Wake, Johnston, Wayne, Lenoir, Jones, Craven, and Carteret.

Wilson's Mills improvements 
A  section of US 70 at Wilson's Mills, connecting to the Clayton Bypass in the west will be upgraded to a freeway for an estimated $31 million. Construction is planned to begin in 2020 and finish around 2022.

Smithfield/Selma improvements 
Improvements are in the planning stages for the  segment of US 70 between Wilson's Mills and Princeton. Some of this section is already freeway, but will require improvements to bring it up to interstate standards and add an interchange with I-95. This proposed project is not currently budgeted nor does it have a timeline for completion.

Princeton bypass 
The existing Princeton bypass will be improved to interstate standards. The  project is estimated to cost $170 million, with construction scheduled to begin in 2028.

Kinston bypass 
The Kinston Bypass is a project that has been in the planning stages since the 1990s. The project was put on hold until 2007 when NCDOT revitalized the project. While several northern bypasses were planned, in January 2014 the northern bypasses were removed in favor of a southern alternative. The project was defunded in 2014 with the release of the 2015–2024 State Transportation Improvement Plan, and studies were suspended. When complete, the bypass would improve regional mobility, connectivity, and capacity for US 70, reducing traffic congestion and delays that exist along US 70 between La Grange and Dover.​ It would be built in phases, and as of 2022, only one phase—just east of LaGrange—is funded for construction, starting in 2028.

James City freeway 
In James City, a  segment of the US 70 improvement project will upgrade the existing highway to freeway standards by elevating it over existing surface streets, improving the frontage roads, and building interchanges. It will connect to the existing US 70 freeway in New Bern. This project is estimated to cost $66 million. Construction is scheduled to begin in early 2020 and be complete in early 2024.

James City to Havelock 
Between James City and Havelock, a  section of US 70 will be converted to interstate standards for $132 million. The money will come primarily from a $147 million federal grant the state received in 2018. With the release of the 2020 draft STIP, it was revealed that NCDOT is attempting to start construction in 2020.

Havelock bypass 
The Havelock Bypass is a planned  four-lane freeway intended to improve existing sections of US 70 and a bypass west of Havelock, through the Croatan National Forest. Draft and environmental studies began in September 2011 and were completed in January 2016. Property acquisition started in 2016, with construction to begin in February 2019. Estimated to cost $173 million, it is scheduled to be completed in 2022.

Gallants channel bridge 
The Gallants Channel Bridge is a project to replace the Dan Taylor Memorial Bridge by rerouting US 70 over Gallants Channel with a  fixed span bridge, widened to four-lanes with a median at a new location, and building a new bridge on Turner Street, for an estimated $66.4 million. Construction began on March 25, 2015, by Conti Enterprises, Inc., of Edison, New Jersey. All work but landscaping is scheduled to be completed by July 15, 2018, with final completion expected in January 2019. Once complete, the existing bascule bridge will be removed and US 70 will be routed out of downtown Beaufort.

Other corridor projects 
Other projects, including improvements between James City and Morehead City, Slocum Gate and the Newport River Bridge are in various stages of planning and construction.

Future Interstate 42 

The Fixing America's Surface Transportation Act (FAST Act), signed by President Barack Obama on December 14, 2015, added the US 70 corridor between Garner and Morehead City to the Interstate system as a future Interstate. Justification for the designation included better connections with Seymour Johnson Air Force Base, the North Carolina Global Transpark, Marine Corps Air Station Cherry Point, and the Port of Morehead City with the rest of state and the eastern seaboard. With no specified number codified in the act, the Regional Transportation Alliance (RTA) expected this corridor to be called I-46 or another suitable designation, and the US Highway 70 Corridor Commission recommended I-50. On March 30, 2016, Governor Pat McCrory and various officials unveiled "Future Interstate" signage along the corridor.

For the Spring 2016 AASHTO Special Committee on U.S. Route Numbering, NCDOT proposed I-36 for this route. On May 24, 2016, AASHTO assigned Interstate 42 for the route.

In October 2021, AASHTO approved two segments of I-42, the  Clayton Bypass and the  Goldsboro Bypass; this was followed by the Federal Highway Administration subsequent approval in March 2022. In May 2022, AASHTO also approved the elimination of US 70 Bypass, clearing the way for NCDOT to fully redesignate the route.

Major intersections

See also 
 Special routes of U.S. Route 70
 North Carolina Bicycle Route 7 - Briefly concurrent with US 70 near Dover and from North River Corner to NC 12

References

External links 

 NCRoads.com: U.S. 70
 US Highway 70 Corridor

70
Transportation in Greensboro, North Carolina
Transportation in Durham, North Carolina
Transportation in Raleigh, North Carolina
Freeways in North Carolina
Transportation in Madison County, North Carolina
Transportation in Buncombe County, North Carolina
Transportation in McDowell County, North Carolina
Transportation in Burke County, North Carolina
Transportation in Catawba County, North Carolina
Transportation in Iredell County, North Carolina
Transportation in Rowan County, North Carolina
Transportation in Davidson County, North Carolina
Transportation in Randolph County, North Carolina
Transportation in Guilford County, North Carolina
Transportation in Alamance County, North Carolina
Transportation in Orange County, North Carolina
Transportation in Durham County, North Carolina
Transportation in Wake County, North Carolina
Transportation in Johnston County, North Carolina
Transportation in Wayne County, North Carolina
Transportation in Lenoir County, North Carolina
Transportation in Jones County, North Carolina
Transportation in Craven County, North Carolina
Transportation in Carteret County, North Carolina
 North Carolina